Lawrence Michael Hinman (born September 26, 1944) is an American philosopher and Professor Emeritus of Philosophy at the University of San Diego.
He is known for his expertise on moral philosophy.

Books
 Ethics: A Pluralistic Approach to Moral Theory. Fifth Edition. Belmont, CA: Wadsworth, 2013
 Contemporary Moral Issues: Diversity and Consensus .Fourth Edition. Upper Saddle River, NJ: Prentice-Hall, 2012

References

21st-century American philosophers
Philosophy academics
Living people
1942 births
Nietzsche scholars
University of San Diego faculty
Loyola University Chicago alumni